Son assault demesne, or "his own first assault," is a form of a plea to justify an assault and battery, by which the defendant asserts that the plaintiff committed an assault upon him, and the defendant merely defended himself. When the plea is supported by evidence, it is a sufficient justification, unless the retaliation by the defendant were excessive, and bore no proportion to the necessity, or to the provocation received. Character evidence that the plaintiff was noted for quarrelsomeness is generally admissible where an answer of son assault demesne is filed.

References

Latin legal terminology